The Hachiman Jinja (彩帆八幡神社) is a derelict Shinto shrine off Kagman Road on the island Saipan in the Northern Mariana Islands, and one of the few on those islands to survive relatively intact.  The shrine, dedicated to the kami Hachiman, was probably built in the 1930s by the Japanese administration of the South Seas Mandate as part of a program to Japanize the large number of Ryukyuan and Korean workers on the island. The shrine survived the World War II Battle of Saipan in remarkably good condition, although its main torii fell, and two komainu (dog-like statues) were lost. The main honden received some maintenance in the 1970s, and the property has received some maintenance from a local landholder. As of 2019, it is in total disrepair.

The shrine was listed on the National Register of Historic Places in 2003.

See also
National Register of Historic Places listings in the Northern Mariana Islands

References

National Register of Historic Places in the Northern Mariana Islands
Religious buildings and structures completed in 1924
Shinto shrines in the Japanese colonial empire
Hachiman shrines
Buildings and structures in Saipan
20th-century Shinto shrines